A seven-part abrogative referendum was held in Italy on 21 May 2000. Voters were asked whether they approved of the repealing of laws on topics including election funding, the electoral system, the judiciary, employment and union dues. Although all but one of the seven proposals were approved by voters, the voter turnout of 32% was well below the 50% threshold and the results were invalidated.

Results

Repealing of the law on the reimbursement of election spending

Repealing of the section of the electoral law on proportional seats

Repealing of the law on the proportional election of Superior Council judges

Separating the careers of magistrates between judgeships and government ministries

Repealing of the law allowing judges to hold other positions

Repealing of the law forcing employers of over 15 people to re-employ workers sacked without sufficient reason

Banning trade unions from collecting dues automatically through provident associations

References

Italian referendum
Referendum
Referendums in Italy
Italian referendum